William Henry Havelock (8 December 1826 – 1 November 1876) was part of the Bombay Civil Service.

Sind
He was the acting Commissioner in Sind from June 1867 to July 1868 during Major General William Merewether's absence.

References

Administrators in British India
1876 deaths
1826 births